In 1984 the West Indies cricket team toured England, playing three One Day Internationals and five Tests. West Indies beat England 2–1 in the ODI series, then whitewashed England 5–0 in the Test series, and as of 2023 this was the only instance England faced such whitewash at home. This was the only test series were home side lose all tests of a 4 or more match series. The West Indies team was captained by Clive Lloyd throughout, and England by David Gower.

The average number of runs by the English captain was 19, as was the average number of runs per English player in the Fifth Test. Comedian Rory Bremner sang about the debacle in the song "N-n-nineteen Not Out", a parody of the Paul Hardcastle Vietnam War song "19".

West Indies touring squad
 Clive Lloyd (captain)
 Gordon Greenidge
 Desmond Haynes
 Larry Gomes
 Viv Richards (vice captain)
 Richie Richardson
 Gus Logie
 Jeff Dujon (wicketkeeper)
 Thelston Payne (wicketkeeper)
 Roger Harper
 Eldine Baptiste
 Michael Holding
 Joel Garner
 Malcolm Marshall
 Courtney Walsh
 Milton Small

Winston Davis replaced Small who went home with a knee injury.

One Day Internationals (ODIs)
The West Indies won the Texaco Trophy 2-1.

1st ODI

2nd ODI

3rd ODI

The three ODIs were played on 31 May, 2 June and 4 June. West Indies won the First ODI at Old Trafford comfortably, thanks to a huge 189* scored by Viv Richards. England bowled West Indies out for 179 in the Second ODI at Trent Bridge, and levelled the series 1–1, but West Indies restricted England to 196 runs in the deciding Third ODI at Lord's and won easily, by 8 wickets.

Test matches
The Test series was a historic 5-0 "blackwash" to West Indies, with victories by wide margins in all 5 Tests.

First Test

England won the toss and decided to bat. Half an hour into the opening session, debutant opening batsman Andy Lloyd was hit on the head by a short-pitched ball bowled by Malcolm Marshall. Lloyd left the field and spent several days in hospital; he did not play cricket again in 1984 and never played another Test Match. England were soon in trouble on 89–5, but Ian Botham hit 64 and England reached a total of 191, with Joel Garner taking 4–53.

West Indies reached 606 in reply, with five batsmen (and extras) reaching half-centuries. Top scorers were Larry Gomes (143) and Viv Richards (117), who shared a third-wicket stand of 206. Richards also became the fourth West Indian batsman to pass 5,000 runs in Tests. Captain Clive Lloyd scored 71, and the West Indian tail-enders were also in the runs, with number 9 Eldine Baptiste (87*) and number 10 Michael Holding (69) sharing a 9th wicket stand of 150. Derek Pringle took 5–108, one of four England  bowlers to concede over 100 runs.

Despite 56 by wicketkeeper Paul Downton, promoted to makeshift opening batsman in the absence of Andy Lloyd, England were unable to save the match, losing on the fourth day, with another 5-55 for Garner.

Second Test

West Indies won the toss and put England in to bat. The decision looked poor after a century opening stand, and England reached 286, with opening batsmen Graeme Fowler (106) and debutant Chris Broad (55) top scorers, and extras third on 35. Marshall took 6-85.

England took a first-innings lead when the West Indies were dismissed for 245, with Botham taking 8-103. This was the first occasion that an Englishman had taken 8 wickets against West Indies in England. Clive Lloyd scored a modest 39, becoming the second West Indian batsman to pass 7,000 Test runs. In England's second innings, Allan Lamb scored 110 and Botham 81, and England declared at 300-9 early on the fifth day.

West Indies achieved the target of 342 runs to win with ease, in 66.1 overs, losing only one wicket, thanks to an unbroken stand of 287 between Gordon Greenidge (214*) and Gomes (92*).

Third Test

England won the toss and batted first again for the third Test running. Lamb reached 100 as England were all out for 270, and 4-70 for Holding. In the process, Holding became the second West Indian to take 200 Test wickets. The West Indies secured a narrow first-innings lead, reaching 302, with 104* to Gomes, and Holding second-highest on 59. Paul Allott took 6–61.

England were bowled out cheaply in their second innings, for 159, with Marshall taking 7–53, his best career bowling analysis to date (notwithstanding a thumb broken in two places), and West Indies reached their victory target with 8 wickets in hand.

Batsman Paul Terry made his Test debut for England, but scored only 8 and 1. This was the last Test played by Bob Willis.

Fourth Test

West Indies won the toss and batted first for the first time in the series. By the close of the second day, they had reached 500 all out, with a second double century for Greenidge (223) and a century for wicketkeeper Jeff Dujon (101). Veteran off-spinner Pat Pocock, recalled for the match, achieved England's best bowling figures, 4–121.

In England's reply, their number 3 batsman, Paul Terry, playing in his second match for England, had scored 7 runs when he was struck by a ball bowled by Winston Davis. His arm was broken, and he left the field. England lost its ninth wicket with 278 runs on the board, needing 23 runs to save the follow-on. Terry returned with his arm in plaster and hanging by a sling. He watched Allan Lamb reach his century, but was then unable to defend his wicket, bowled without adding to his score by Joel Garner, his fourth wicket (4–51).  England had reached 280, with Lamb again top scorer on 100*, his third century in consecutive Test matches, and extras second highest, on 44.

England were made to follow on, and were bowled out for 156, Roger Harper's off spin taking 6–57. Terry did not bat for England again.

Fifth Test

In the final Test, West Indies won the toss again, and again decided to bat. England bowlers Jonathan Agnew and Richard Ellison made their debuts, and England achieved rare penetration with the ball, reducing West Indies to 70–6. Clive Lloyd scored 60*, to bring them to a more respectable total of 190 all out before the close on the first day. Botham took 5–72, becoming the first cricketer to reach the all-rounders "triple double" of 300 wickets and 3,000 runs in Tests.

England's batsmen were unable to capitalise on the relative success of their bowlers. They were bowled out for 162, with only Fowler scoring more than 20, Marshall taking 5–35. West Indies piled on the runs in their second innings, reaching 346, with a century to Desmond Haynes (125). Needing to score 375 to win, England subsided to 202 all out, with Botham top scorer on 54. Garner (4–51) and Holding (5–43) taking 9 wickets between them. On the final day, Pocock was the fourth Test cricketer to be dismissed for a "pair" in consecutive matches.

Legacy
West Indies achieved the fifth 5–0 whitewash in Test history, the first (and to date only) whitewash by a touring side in a test series that longer than three matches, an unusual feat for a series played in England considering its variable summer weather. By the end of the Fifth Test the West Indies had won eight tests in a row and would go on to set the then-record of 11 consecutive wins. This series is generally seen as the height of West Indies' power, and the West Indies would remain the dominant Test nation for the rest of the decade.

Annual reviews
 Playfair Cricket Annual 1985
 Wisden Cricketers' Almanack 1985

References

External links
 The 1984 series, BBC Sport, 19 June 2000
Cricinfo complete itinerary of tour

1984 in cricket
1984 in English cricket
1984
International cricket competitions from 1980–81 to 1985